International Journal of Green Pharmacy is a peer-reviewed open access academic journal of pharmaceutical sciences published by Medknow Publications on behalf of the B R Nahata Smriti Sansthan, Mandsaur. The journal was established in 2007.

Indexing and abstracting

The journal is indexed and abstracted in the following bibliographic databases:

References

External links 
 Official Website

Open access journals
Quarterly journals
English-language journals
Pharmacology journals
Medknow Publications academic journals